Zagan may refer to:

Zagan (demon), a demon in the Ars Goetia
Żagań, a town in west Poland